J B Lefebvre was a Quebec shoe store retailer that existed from 1912 to 2004. In 1947 it had nineteen stores.

References

Defunct retail companies of Canada
Clothing retailers of Canada
Companies based in Montreal